Jade Water Village is a natural village in the town of Baisha, Yulong Naxi Autonomous County, Lijiang, Yunnan, China. The village serves as a Dongba cultural centre, and a home to Nakhi people. The village is near Jade Dragon Snow Mountain.

References 

Yulong Naxi Autonomous County
Villages in Yunnan